The History and Fall of Caius Marius is a tragedy written by English writer Thomas Otway. The play was first performed in 1679 and is indebted to William Shakespeare's tragedy, Romeo and Juliet. It is based on the Roman civil wars of Marius and his rival Sulla.

It was originally staged by the Duke's Company at the Dorset Garden Theatre in London. The cast included Thomas Betterton as Caius Marius, Joseph Williams as Sylla, William Smith as Marius Junior, Thomas Percival as Granius, Thomas Gillow as Metellus, Thomas Jevon as Cinna, Cave Underhill as  Sulpitius, James Nokes as Nurse and Elizabeth Barry as Lavinia. The published version was dedicated to the politician Lord Falkland.

It was created in the late 1600s, somewhere around 1680.

Characters 

The list of characters below:

 Caius Marius
 Sylla
 Marius Junior
 Granius
 Metellus
 Cinna
 Priest
 Apothecary
 Sulpitius
 Quintus Pompeius
 Quintus Pompeius' son
 Lavina
 Nurse

Guards, ruffians and lictors also appear in the play.

References 

1679 plays
Plays set in the Roman Republic
Tragedy plays
Cultural depictions of Sulla
Plays about war
English Restoration plays
Plays and musicals based on Romeo and Juliet
Plays by Thomas Otway